Danilo of Montenegro may refer to:

 Danilo I, Metropolitan of Montenegro, in office (1697-1735)
 Danilo II, Metropolitan of Montenegro, in office (1961-1990)

 Danilo I, Prince of Montenegro, ruling prince (1826–1860)
 Danilo, Crown Prince of Montenegro (b. 1871 - d. 1939)

See also
 Danilo I (disambiguation)
 Danilo II (disambiguation)